Nothing in Common is a 1986 American comedy-drama film directed by Garry Marshall. It stars Tom Hanks and Jackie Gleason in what would be Gleason's final film role; he was suffering from cancer during the production and died less than a year after the film's release.

While the film did make back over 2.5 times its budget, it was not considered a big financial success on initial release, though it became more popular as Hanks' fame grew. It is considered by some to be a pivotal role in Hanks' career because it marked his transition from less developed comedic roles to leads in more serious stories, and many critics also praised Gleason's performance.

Plot
David Basner, a shallow, childish yuppie recently promoted at his Chicago ad agency, returns to work from a vacation. His parents have separated after 36 years of marriage and he must care for his aging, bitter father, Max, and support his emotionally fragile mother, Lorraine. His father has just been fired after 35 years in the garment industry.

Although his ex-girlfriend, Donna, is sympathetic, she tells him he ought to "grow up". David believes that if he became less child-like, his advertising work could be adversely affected. 

David is developing a commercial for Colonial Airlines, owned by the rich and bullish Andrew Woolridge. A successful ad campaign would likely gain him a partnership in his company. David develops a relationship with Woolridge's daughter, Cheryl Ann Wayne. His father is well aware of his playboy nature, and is critical of his frivolous lifestyle.

His parents each begin to rely more on David. His mother needs help moving to a new apartment. His father needs to be driven to his doctor. David is awakened late one night when his mother's date ends badly, and she reveals that Max humiliated her sexually and was unfaithful. Confronting his father, he tells him, "Tomorrow I'm shooting a commercial about a family who loves each other, who cares about each other. I'm fakin' it." David becomes distracted by his attention demanding parents, which affects his work. 

As a peace offering, David takes Max out to a club to hear some jazz music. He discovers that Max is severely diabetic and hasn't been following his diet. As a result, Max requires amputation of some toes and a foot. He and Lorraine discuss their life together, and she condemns him for his abuse. Privately, Max is overwhelmed with regret.

Woolridge insists that David accompany him to New York to promote the new ad campaign, which would prevent him from being present for Max's surgery. When David refuses, he loses the account. His boss Charlie is sympathetic and assures him he will intercede with Woolridge, giving David time to be with his father.

Confiding with Donna about the situation at work and his father's health problems, she gives David a sympathetic ear. He reaches out for her hand, and they show to be mutually interested again.

David brings Max home from the hospital, who tells him, "You were the last person I thought would ever come through for me." When David returns to his job, he takes him along while he shoots commercials.

Cast
 Tom Hanks as David Basner
 Jackie Gleason as Max Basner
 Eva Marie Saint as Lorraine Basner
 Hector Elizondo as Charlie Gargas
 Barry Corbin as Andrew Woolridge
 Sela Ward as Cheryl Ann Wayne
 Bess Armstrong as Donna Mildred Martin
 Dan McGuire as The Caddie

Critical reception 
The film received mixed reviews from critics. Review aggregator Rotten Tomatoes reports that 54% out of 24 professional critics gave the film a positive review, with an average score of 5.9/10.

Roger Ebert of The Chicago Sun-Times awarded the film a 2.5 out of 4 stars and stated in his review "The movie splits in two, starting out as a wise-guy comedy and ending up as the heart-breaking story of a yuppie who is trying to understand his bitter, lonely parents. Movies aren't novels."

Audiences polled by CinemaScore gave the film an average grade of "A−" on an A+ to F scale.

Then-U.S. President Ronald Reagan viewed this film at Camp David on August 2, 1986.

Soundtrack

 "Nothing in Common" by Thompson Twins - 3:30
 "Burning of the Heart" by Richard Marx - 4:15
 "If It Wasn't Love" by Carly Simon - 4:18
 "Over the Weekend" by Nick Heyward - 3:58
 "Loving Strangers" (David's Theme From Nothing In Common) by Christopher Cross - 4:03
 "Until You Say You Love Me" by Aretha Franklin - 4:50
 "Don't Forget to Dance" by The Kinks - 4:35
 "No One's Gonna Love You" by Real To Reel - 4:12
 "Seven Summers" by Cruzados - 4:38
 Instrumental Theme by Patrick Leonard - 2:08

The soundtrack was released on LP, CD and cassette in 1986 by Arista Records.

Television series
 
The movie inspired a short-lived NBC sitcom in 1987 that was scheduled to follow the highly rated Cheers. Due to audience drop-off, the sitcom was cancelled. The series starred Todd Waring as David Basner and Bill Macy as his father Max Basner.

See also
 List of films featuring diabetes

References

External links
 
 
 
 

1986 films
1980s romantic comedy-drama films
American business films
American romantic comedy-drama films
Films about father–son relationships
Films about advertising
Films adapted into television shows
Films directed by Garry Marshall
Films set in Chicago
Films shot in Illinois
Films shot in Chicago
TriStar Pictures films
1980s English-language films
1980s American films
Films about disability